Koznik is a small mountain in Kosovo. The White Drin River flows to the west of Koznik while the Miruša flows to the north of Koznik.

References

External links

Mountains of Kosovo

nn:Koznik